Hysterocladia roseicollis is a moth of the Megalopygidae family. It was described by Paul Dognin in 1914. It is found in Peru and French Guiana.

References

Moths described in 1914
Megalopygidae